Kent Larson is an architect, entrepreneur, and academic, currently the director of the City Science research group at the MIT Media Lab. Before joining MIT full-time in 2000, Larson practiced architecture for 15 years in New York City. His research focuses on developing urban interventions that enable more entrepreneurial, livable, high-performance urban districts. He led the establishment of an international network of affiliated City Science labs. He has helped found spin-offs of the City Science group at the MIT Media lab, including L3Cities and ORI Living.

Career at MIT
Larson's Projects include compact transformable housing, ultralight autonomous mobility systems, sensing and algorithms to recognize and respond to complex human behavior, and advanced modeling, simulation, and tangible interfaces for urban design. Larson and his researchers from his MIT lab received 10-Year Impact Awards from Ubicomp in 2017 and 2019 for recognition of work that, with the test of time, has had the greatest impact.

Urban Mobility-on-Demand
Upon the 2010 death of William J. Mitchell, former Dean of the MIT School of Architecture and Planning, Larson's group continued work on the MIT CityCar and developed concepts for shared-use light electric vehicles and intelligent fleet management to provide high-levels of service through sensor networks, dynamic incentives, and intelligent charging.  The group worked with automotive suppliers in Spain to develop a commercial version of the MIT CityCar called Hiriko: a folding two-passenger vehicle with robot wheels and drive-by-wire control for urban mobility and highly efficient parking.

Personal life
Larson lives in Jamaica Plain, Boston, with his wife, Maria Miller Larson.

References

External links
 
 Kent Larson: Brilliant designs to fit more people in every city (TEDxBoston 2012)

Architects from New York City
Living people
Year of birth missing (living people)
MIT Media Lab people